The 2015–16 Alabama Crimson Tide men's basketball team represents the University of Alabama in the 2015–16 college basketball season. The Crimson Tide, led by third year head coach Kristy Curry, played their games at Foster Auditorium with two games at Coleman Coliseum and were members of the Southeastern Conference. They finished the season 15–16, 4–12 in SEC play to finish in twelfth place. They lost in the first round of the SEC women's tournament to LSU. They were invited to the Women's National Invitation Tournament where they lost in the first round to Tulane.

Roster

Schedule

|-
!colspan=9 style="background:#990000; color:#FFFFFF;"| Exhibition

|-
!colspan=9 style="background:#990000; color:#FFFFFF;"| Non-conference regular season

|-
!colspan=9 style="background:#990000; color:#FFFFFF;"| SEC regular season

|-
!colspan=12 style="text-align: center; background:#990000"|2016 SEC Tournament

|-
!colspan=12 style="text-align: center; background:#990000"|WNIT

See also
2015–16 Alabama Crimson Tide men's basketball team

References

Alabama
Alabama Crimson Tide women's basketball seasons
2016 Women's National Invitation Tournament participants
Alabama Crimson Tide
Alabama Crimson Tide